George Gore Ousley Higgins (15 October 1818 – 8 May 1874) was an Irish Whig and Independent Irish Party politician.

The second son of Fitzgerald Higgins and Mary née Ouseley, Higgins first entered work as a civil servant for the Colony of Jamaica, and was also a Justice of the Peace for County Mayo.

Higgins was elected Whig MP for Mayo at a by-election in 1850—caused by the death of Robert Dillon Browne—and, becoming an Independent Irish MP in 1852, held the seat until 1857 when he stood again as  Whig but was defeated.

References

External links
 

1818 births
1874 deaths
Irish justices of the peace
Members of the Parliament of the United Kingdom for County Mayo constituencies (1801–1922)
UK MPs 1847–1852
UK MPs 1852–1857
Whig (British political party) MPs for Irish constituencies
Irish Nationalist politicians